Schmidhuber is a German surname. Notable people with the surname include:

 Aron Schmidhuber (born 1947), German football referee
 August Schmidhuber (1901–1947), German Nazi SS officer executed for war crimes
 Gerhard Schmidhuber (1894–1945), German general
 Guillermo Schmidhuber (born 1943), Mexican playwright and novelist
 Jürgen Schmidhuber (born 1963), German computer scientist
 Peter Schmidhuber (born 1931), German politician

German-language surnames